Goursat's lemma, named after the French mathematician Édouard Goursat, is an algebraic theorem about subgroups of the direct product of two groups.

It can be stated more generally in a Goursat variety (and consequently it also holds in any Maltsev variety), from which one recovers a more general version of Zassenhaus' butterfly lemma. In this form, Goursat's theorem also implies the snake lemma.

Groups 
Goursat's lemma for groups can be stated as follows.
One then obtains a bijection between :

An immediate consequence of this is that the subdirect product of two groups can be described as a fiber product and vice versa.

The proof below further shows that the map is an isomorphism.

Proof 

It is in this sense that  and  can be identified as normal in G and G''', respectively.

Since  is a homomorphism, its kernel N is normal in H. Moreover, given , there exists , since  is surjective.  Therefore,  is normal in G, viz:
.
It follows that  is normal in  since
 .

The proof that  is normal in  proceeds in a similar manner.

On to the proof. Since  is surjective, this relation is the graph of a well-defined function  provided  for every , essentially an application of the vertical line test.

Since  (more properly), we have . Thus , whence , that is, .

Furthermore, for every  we have . It follows that this function is a group homomorphism.

By symmetry,  is the graph of a well-defined homomorphism . These two homomorphisms are clearly inverse to each other and thus are indeed isomorphisms.

 Goursat varieties 

As a consequence of Goursat's theorem, one can derive a very general version on the Jordan–Hölder–Schreier theorem in Goursat varieties.

 References 
 Édouard Goursat, "Sur les substitutions orthogonales et les divisions régulières de l'espace", Annales Scientifiques de l'École Normale Supérieure (1889), Volume: 6, pages 9–102
 
 Kenneth A. Ribet (Autumn 1976), "Galois Action on Division Points of Abelian Varieties with Real Multiplications", American Journal of Mathematics'', Vol. 98, No. 3, 751–804.

Lemmas in group theory
Articles containing proofs